The 2003 Northern Ireland Assembly election was held on Wednesday, 26 November 2003, after being suspended for just over a year. It was the second election to take place since the devolved assembly was established in 1998. Each of Northern Ireland's eighteen Westminster Parliamentary constituencies elected six members by single transferable vote, giving a total of 108 Members of the Legislative Assembly (MLAs). The election was contested by 18 parties and many independent candidates.

Background
The election was originally planned for May 2003, but was delayed by Paul Murphy, the Secretary of State for Northern Ireland.

Several sitting MLAs stood under a different label to the one they had used in the 1998 election. Some had failed to be selected by their parties to stand and so stood as independents, whilst others had changed parties during the course of the assembly. Most of these realignments occurred within the unionist parties, with several defections between existing parties, and two new parties being formed – the United Unionist Coalition (formed by the three MLAs elected as independent unionists, though one later joined the DUP) and the Northern Ireland Unionist Party (formed by four of the five MLAs elected as the UK Unionist Party, though one later left them, joined the DUP for a period, then contested the election as an independent unionist).

The SDLP, which had been Northern Ireland's dominant Irish nationalist party during the 1980s and 1990s, went into this election with concerns that they could lose numerous seats to fellow nationalists Sinn Féin, who had overtaken the SDLP in terms of votes and seats at the 2001 United Kingdom general election. Commentator, Brian Feeney, said: "The SDLP has a series of baronial figures - John Hume, Seamus Mallon, Eddie McGrady - who hung on to power and didn't groom their successors early enough. They just don't have enough people on the ground in some areas of the province. Sinn Féin, by contrast, has deliberately cultivated collective leadership, bringing forward wave after wave of young, articulate, highly politicised heirs apparent, and their grassroots organisation is awesome."

Results
On the unionist side, the Democratic Unionist Party (DUP) became Northern Ireland's biggest party for the first time in any election, overtaking the Ulster Unionist Party (UUP). They gained ten seats, primarily at the expense of smaller unionist parties, to become the largest party both in seats and votes, winning thirty overall. The UUP increased their vote slightly, despite slipping to third place in first preference votes, and won 27 seats, a net loss of one. Shortly after the election three Ulster Unionist MLAs, Jeffrey Donaldson, Norah Beare and Arlene Foster, quit the party and later defected to the DUP.

On the nationalist side, Sinn Féin saw a big increase in their vote, gaining six seats at the net expense of the Social Democratic and Labour Party, for a total of 24 seats.

The minor parties all saw a significant fall in their support. The Alliance Party managed to hold all six of its seats despite their vote falling by a third, the Women's Coalition, United Unionist Coalition and Northern Ireland Unionist Party were all wiped out, and the Progressive Unionist Party and UK Unionist Party won just one seat each. Neither the United Unionist Assembly Party nor the Northern Ireland Unionists won any seats.

The biggest surprise of the election came in West Tyrone with the election of the independent Kieran Deeny, a doctor campaigning on the single issue of hospital provision in Omagh.

References

Manifestos
 Alliance Works, Alliance
 Fair Deal Manifesto 2003, Democratic Unionist Party
 Meeting the Challenges - Seizing the Opportunities, Green Party Northern Ireland
 Assembly Election 2003, Northern Ireland Conservatives
 Change the Face of Politics, Northern Ireland Women's Coalition
 2003 Election Manifesto, Progressive Unionist Party
 Agenda for Government, Sinn Féin
 Reshaping Government, Rebuilding Public Services, Social Democratic and Labour Party
 Turn the Tide, Socialist Environmental Alliance
 Manifesto 2003, Ulster Unionist Party
 It Wont Work... Without the Workers' Party, Workers' Party

2003
2003 elections in the United Kingdom
2003 in Northern Ireland
November 2003 events in the United Kingdom
2003 elections in Northern Ireland